Stephen Frank Carter (October 29, 1943 – January 26, 2021) was an American politician from Louisiana who served in the Louisiana House of Representatives for the 68th district as a Republican from 2008 to 2020.

Career
He was first elected in 2007 after defeating Kyle Ardoin in a run-off election. In 2019, due to term limits, he ran unsuccessfully for a seat in the Louisiana State Senate. Carter was the Republican nominee in the 2020 Baton Rouge mayoral election, placing second after Sharon Weston Broome.

Personal life 
Carter died from COVID-19 on January 26, 2021.

References

External links

1943 births
2021 deaths
Republican Party members of the Louisiana House of Representatives
Deaths from the COVID-19 pandemic in Louisiana
Louisiana State University alumni
21st-century American politicians